Martha Capps Oliver (Capps; pen name, Martha C. Oliver; August 27, 1845 – August 15, 1917) was an American poet and hymnwriter. She was the author of A Year of Sacred Song (1895), A Year's Good Wishes (1895), Round the Year with the Poets (1900), The Far West, Easter Legend, and Christmas Legend, as well as several hundred Easter and Christmas booklets and poems, numerous songs, hymns, anthems, and cantatas. Oliver died in 1917.

Early life and education
Martha W. Capps was born in Jacksonville, Illinois, August 27, 1845. Her father, Joseph Capps (1811-1872), was the son of a Kentucky slave-owner, but was himself an opponent of slavery, and therefore moved to Illinois as slavery was prohibited there. In Illinois, he married Sarah Ann Higgins Reid (1819-1892). Oliver had three older siblings, Stephen, Emma and William, as well as three younger ones, Joseph, Charles, and Effie.

Oliver was educated in the Illinois Female College, where she took high rank in her studies, early showing a talent for composition. From her father, she inherited an aptitude for versification and a temperament which was quick to receive impressions.

Career

In Morgan, Illinois, December 28, 1865, she married William Archibald Oliver (1841-1904). 

Some of her verses soon found their way into print. They met with such appreciation that she finally began to write for publication. A number of her poems were used in England for illustrated booklets. As a writer, she was quite as kindly received there as in America. In collaboration with Ida Scott Taylor McKinney, she published several juvenile books in verse, entitled The Story of Columbus, In Slavery Days, and The Far West. She also gave some attention to sacred song and hymn writing.

Personal life
Oliver was an active church member. She died August 15, 1917, in Jacksonville, and was buried at Diamond Grove Cemetery in that city.

Selected works

By Martha Capps Oliver
 A year of sacred song : with selections in prose from sources old and new, 1895
 Round the Year with the Poets: A Compilation of Nature Poems, 1900

By Martha C. Oliver
 "Keep Your Covenant With Jesus", (hymn; lyrics by Martha C. Oliver; composer, W. H. Doane, 1883)
 A year's good wishes in prose and poetry, 1895
 The Story of Columbus Told in Rhyme (Ida Scott Taylor and Martha C. Oliver , illustrated by A. Melrose; 1890)
 In Slavery Days
 The Far West

References

Bibliography

External links
 
 

1845 births
1917 deaths
19th-century American poets
20th-century American poets
19th-century American women writers
20th-century American women writers
Writers from Illinois
People from Jacksonville, Illinois
American women poets
American hymnwriters
Wikipedia articles incorporating text from A Woman of the Century